Vallecito Creek can mean;

 Vallecito Creek (California), in San Diego County, California 
 Vallecito Creek (Colorado)
 Vallecito Creek (New Mexico)